To All the Boys: P.S. I Still Love You is a 2020 American teen romantic comedy film directed by Michael Fimognari and written by Sofia Alvarez and J. Mills Goodloe.  The film stars Lana Condor, Noah Centineo, Janel Parrish, Anna Cathcart, Trezzo Mahoro, Madeleine Arthur, Emilija Baranac, Kelcey Mawema, Jordan Fisher, Ross Butler, Julie Tao, Sarayu Blue, John Corbett, and Holland Taylor. The film is based on Jenny Han's 2015 novel P.S. I Still Love You.

The film is a sequel to To All the Boys I've Loved Before (2018), and the second installment in the To All the Boys film series. The film was released on February 12, 2020 exclusively on Netflix, with a third film titled To All the Boys: Always and Forever released on February 12, 2021. It received mixed reviews.

Plot 
Lara Jean Covey's high school sets up a volunteer program. While her boyfriend Peter Kavinsky volunteers with his friends, Lara Jean goes to Belleview Retirement Home instead,  following in her older sister Margot's footsteps.

On her first day there, she meets Stormy, an eccentric old lady who Margot often mentioned, and also discovers that John Ambrose McClaren volunteers at Belleview. They talk about a love letter she had written to him many years ago, and he lets her read the letter as long as she gives it back to him afterward. Lara Jean is unable to stop thinking about their conversation and, in addition, is constantly insecure about her relationship with Peter because she cannot stop comparing herself with her ex-best friend, and Peter's ex-girlfriend, Gen.

On Valentine's Day, Lara Jean witnesses her classmates being serenaded by special acapella groups and is told that Peter had sent a group to serenade Gen every period, back when they were still dating. This enhances her insecurity, though she forgets about this when she meets with Peter later that day. He gives her a silver heart necklace and reads a poem, which she believes is original but turns out to be two verses of an Edgar Allan Poe poem. He later apologizes and tells her he wishes he could write something like that for her, though he means everything in the poem.

While volunteering at Belleview, Lara Jean and John Ambrose grow closer and throw a Star Ball for Belleview after discovering some old decorations. John Ambrose appears to be developing feelings for Lara Jean, who has not told him about her relationship with Peter. Lara Jean and John Ambrose go to the treehouse where they hung out in middle school to dig up the time capsule they buried years ago with their friends, including Gen, and take turns unpacking it. Gen claims that she didn't put anything in the time capsule. Peter gets jealous of John Ambrose and reveals his relationship with Lara Jean. She and Peter argue but end up making up.

The next day, Lara Jean apologizes to John Ambrose for not telling him about Peter, and then dresses up for Peter's game. As she is waiting for Peter to come out to meet her, Chris shows her a photo of Peter and Gen. She confronts Peter and realizes that Peter never stopped talking to Gen and that, on the ski trip, Peter was planning to get back together with Gen. As Peter is in a rush to get to the game, he tells Lara Jean they will have to talk about it later, but she is too hurt and breaks up with him. She goes to the treehouse later and meets Gen, who reveals that Peter was only comforting her as her parents are separating, and that she went to Peter because he had undergone the same experience. She also says that Peter is crazy about Lara Jean, and that Lara Jean shouldn't doubt him. She then reveals that she had, in fact, put a friendship bracelet identical to Lara Jean's in the capsule, and was too embarrassed to show it. Lara Jean realizes that it was her and not Peter who always had Gen on her mind, and makes up with Gen.

On the night of the retirees' ball, Stormy gives Lara Jean a dress and a makeover. She and John Ambrose dance before going outside in the snow. When they kiss, Lara Jean realizes that she truly loves Peter and does not hold feelings for John. She apologizes to him and rushes outside, surprised to find Peter waiting outside for her. He is waiting outside because he remembers she does not like driving in the snow, a fact that she told him on their first date. He says that she can break his heart if she wants, but instead she says that she loves him, and he tells her he loves her back. They kiss and make up, and in an ending voiceover Lara Jean says that she had wanted a fairytale relationship with Peter, but is now satisfied with what she has.

Cast and characters
 Lana Condor as Lara Jean, a high school student and Peter’s girlfriend
 Momona Tamada as young Lara Jean
 Noah Centineo as Peter, Lara Jean's boyfriend and a popular lacrosse player
 Jordan Fisher as John Ambrose, Lara Jean's crush in sixth grade
 Anna Cathcart as Kitty, Lara Jean's playful little sister who got her and Peter together
 Janel Parrish as Margot, Lara Jean's mature and responsible older sister who goes to college in Scotland
 Ross Butler as Trevor, Peter and Lara Jean's very close friend and Chris’ boyfriend
 Madeleine Arthur as Chris, Gen's cousin and Lara Jean's best friend who goes by "Chris"
 Emilija Baranac as Genevieve, also known as Gen, a pretty and popular girl who is Peter's ex and Lara Jean's best-friend-turned-rival
 Trezzo Mahoro as Lucas, Lara Jean's gay and amiable friend as well as one of her former loves
 Holland Taylor as Stormy: An eccentric elderly woman with impeccable style, who lives in the nursing home at which Lara Jean volunteers.
 Sarayu Blue as Trina Rothschild, the Coveys' friendly neighbor who develops a budding romance with Lara Jean's dad
 John Corbett as Dr. Covey, Lara Jean's kind and somewhat protective father

 Kelcey Mawema as Emily, Gen's friend
 Julie Tao as Haven, the Covey girls' cousin

Maddie Ziegler appears in a cameo.

Production

Development
In August 2018, Jenny Han, author of the source novel, said of a film sequel to To All the Boys I've Loved Before, which would adapt Han's second book in the series, P.S. I Still Love You:

In November 2018, it was reported that Netflix and Paramount Pictures' Awesomeness Films were in discussions to produce a sequel, and Netflix announced the development of a sequel featuring Condor and Centineo in December 2018. In March 2019, it was reported that Michael Fimognari, cinematographer on the first film, would make his feature film directorial debut with the sequel, taking over from the original film's director Susan Johnson, who would stay on to executive produce. It was also announced that Parrish, Cathcart, and Corbett would return to costar. 
It was also announced that J. Mills Goodloe was hired to write the sequel.

The sequel has also cast Jordan Fisher as John Ambrose McClaren, a past love of Lara Jean's, and Ross Butler as Trevor Pike, one of Peter's best friends. Madeleine Arthur would reprise her role as Chris, while Holland Taylor and Sarayu Blue have joined the cast as Stormy McClaren and Trina Rothschild respectively.

Filming
Principal photography began in Vancouver, British Columbia and the surrounding areas on March 27, 2019. As with the first film, scenes at Lara Jean's high school were filmed at Point Grey Secondary School. Principal photography wrapped on May 10, 2019.

Music 

The song "Moral of the Story" by Ashe experienced viral international success after appearing in the film. The film's soundtrack was released digitally on February 7, 2020 by Capitol Records, with a CD release on April 17 and a vinyl release on May 22.

Release
The first trailer for To All the Boys: P.S. I Still Love You was released on December 19, 2019, revealing that the film would be released exclusively on Netflix on February 12, 2020.

Reception
The website's critical consensus reads, "To All the Boys: P.S. I Still Love You may feel like little more than an amiable postscript to its predecessor, but fans of the original should still find this a swoonworthy sequel." On Metacritic, the film has a weighted average score of 54 out of 100, based on reviews from 16 critics, indicating "mixed or average reviews".

Nick Allen of RogerEbert.com gave the film 2 1/2 stars out of 4, and wrote that "its enjoyment will depend largely on whether you want Peter to be the main boy that Lara loves, or not." He added, "It's hard to get past the hope that Lara Jean will someday soon get something better—a better boyfriend, and a better movie."

Sequel

A third film, based on the third novel in the trilogy, began filming on July 15, 2019, two months after production on the second film wrapped.

References

External links
 

2020 films
2020 romantic comedy films
American romantic comedy films
American sequel films
American teen comedy films
American teen romance films
Awesomeness Films films
Films based on American novels
Films based on romance novels
Films based on young adult literature
Films set in Portland, Oregon
Films shot in Vancouver
English-language Netflix original films
Overbrook Entertainment films
Paramount Pictures films
Films about Vietnamese Americans
2020s English-language films
2020 directorial debut films
2020s American films